Sisyphus: The Myth, also known as Sisyphus, is a 2021 South Korean television series starring Cho Seung-woo and Park Shin-hye. Labeled as "JTBC's 10th Anniversary Special Drama", it aired on JTBC from February 17 to April 8, 2021; each episode was released on Netflix in South Korea and internationally after their television broadcast every Wednesday and Thursday at 21:00 (KST).

Synopsis
An unfathomable event introduces a famous engineer (Cho Seung-woo) to dangerous secrets and to a beautiful woman (Park Shin-hye) from the future who has come looking for him.

Cast

Main
 Cho Seung-woo as Han Tae-sul
 Jung Hyeon-jun as young Han Tae-sul
 A genius engineer, quantum physicist, CEO and the co-founder of the company Quantum and Time. Rude and arrogant at first, he later becomes more understanding after meeting Seo-hae. He gets involved in a conspiracy to start a war when he saves the flight he was on from crashing down to the ground, only to see unexplained things that lead him to uncovering the real reason behind his older brother's unexplained death.
 Park Shin-hye as Gang Seo-hae
 Seo Yi-soo as young Gang Seo-hae
 A mysterious woman from the future intent on saving the war ravaged world from destruction. She is the daughter of Dong-ki. She has lived in a bunker for eight years before coming out to explore and scavenge the war-torn Korea. A battle-hardened elite warrior, she travels to the past to save Tae-sul from death and prevent him from inventing the Uploader, a time machine capable of launching people and things to the past, including a nuke.

Supporting
 Heo Joon-seok as Han Tae-san
 Cha Sung-je as young Han Tae-san
 Tae-sul's protective older brother who supposedly died ten years ago. He faked his death to track down Sigma, whom he has found out to be his younger brother's former classmate and the mastermind behind the future war as well as the rise of Tae-sul as the CEO of Quantum and Time.
 Chae Jong-hyeop as "Sun" / Choi Jae-sun
 A former restaurant worker who becomes wealthy with Seo-hae's help, he aids the lead characters because of his fondness towards Seo-hae.

Quantum and Time
 Tae In-ho as Eddie Kim / Kim Seung-bok
 Co-CEO of Quantum and Time and Tae-sul's best friend, though their friendship begins to drift apart due to Tae-sul's erratic behavior.
 Jung Hye-in as Kim Seo-jin / Kim Agnes
 A psychiatrist and daughter of the chairman of Quantum and Time, Kim Han-yong. She previously dated Han Tae-sul before becoming the fiancée of Eddie Kim, though they later break up. Like her father, she is in league with Sigma.
A future version of her, named "Agnes", later appears, running an orphanage for children who crossed over from the future to the past. She is part of the Advance Team.
 Jeon Gook-hwan as Kim Han-yong
 The chairman of Quantum and Time and Seo-jin's father, who aids Sigma to cure his wife of ALS.
 Tae Won-seok as Yeo Bong-sun
 Tae-sul's loyal assistant and bodyguard. He is later in a vegetative state after the shooting at the Busan Expo, waking up during the war and learning of Tae-sul's death in the past. He tries to change the future when Seo-hae encounters him on her way to the Uploader.

The Control Bureau Team 7
 Choi Jung-woo as Hwang Hyun-seung
 The head of the 7th division of the Immigration and Foreign Affairs, also known as the Control Bureau. He is a former NIS agent.
 Yang Joon-mo as Choi Yeon-sik
 A high-ranking agent in the 7th division of the Control Bureau.
 Go Yoon as Jung Hyun-gi
 A newcomer Control Bureau agent and a former cop, intent on killing Seo-hae, who he believes killed his mother. He is also a colleague of Dong-ki.
 Park Young-bin as Kwon Hyuk-bum
 An agent in the 7th division of the Control Bureau.
 Lim Ji-sub as Ma Yong-suk
 An agent in the 7th division of the Control Bureau.

Asia Mart
 Sung Dong-il as Park Hyeong-do
 A man from the future who runs Asia Mart, a convenience store on the outside and a broker business dedicated to helping time-travelers in the inside. He is a member of the Advance Team.
 Jung Ha-joon as Uhm Seon-ho
 Lee Myeong-ro as Uhm Seon-jae
 Lee Si-woo as Lee Ji-eun/Bingbing
 Park Hyeong-do's long lost biological daughter from the future. She came to the past ahead of her mother and has been waiting ever since. She wasn't sure to tell Hyeong-do about her true identity, only to be exposed to Hyeong-do by Tae-sul.

Sigma
 Kim Byung-chul as Sigma / Seo Won-Ju / Seo Gil-Bok
 A mysterious character from the future who has been manipulating past events in his favor. He was Tae-sul's former classmate in elementary school. He was abused by his father, leading him to kill his father with a science formula he learned from Tae-sul when he saved him from bullying. Later he appears as an amateur painter, as Seo Gil-Bok. He tries to hang himself because of his miserable life, thinking that no one loves him. Due to his rough childhood and adulthood, he developed a sense of loneliness and thought that his mandate was to destroy the world. In the future, he is the leader of the Advance Team. He starts the nuclear war.
 Lee Jae-won as Kim Dong-hyeon
 A fund manager who helps Sigma develop his business in the stock market. At first, he was just a stock manager/advisor to Seo Won-ju and didn't believe that he would predict stock exchanges. After seeing that Won-ju's prediction of the stock market was true, he became rich. He tried to warn Tae-sul about the incoming war, only to be killed by Won-ju. (Ep. 1 & 8)

Others
 Kim Jong-tae as Kang Dong-ki
 Seo-hae's father, who teaches her how to survive during the war. He is a veteran Senior Inspector of the National Police Agency and former colleague of Jung Hyun-gi.
 Lee Yeon-soo as Lee Eun-hee
 Seo-hae's mother, who sacrifices herself to save her husband and daughter at the beginning of the war.
 Kim Hee-ryeong as Kim Han-yong's wife
 A woman with ALS, her husband and daughter are desperate to cure her through any means necessary, even if it means betraying their friends.
 Shin Young-jin as Choi Jae-sun's mother.
 Ha Yu-ri as Choi Go-eun
 Choi Jae-sun's sister.

Special appearances
 Kim Byung-chun as the owner of the Chinese restaurant where Jae-sun works (Ep. 1–2)
 He is the owner of the Chinese restaurant and has vowed that he would not die of suicide. He is later killed by the Control Bureau, making it look like suicide.
 Hwang Dong-joo as the co-pilot (Ep. 1–2)
 He is the co-pilot in which Tae-sul was in during the beginning part of the story. He was later tortured and killed by the Control Bureau for seeing what he shouldn't have.
 Sung Byoung-sook as Jung Hyun-gi's mother (Ep. 4)
 Jung Hyun-gi's mother who passed away from illness while Hyun-gi was imprisoned in the Control Bureau jail. Her death was blamed on Seo-hae, giving the present Hyun-gi a reason to join the Control Bureau.

Production

Development
In May 2016, screenwriting duo Lee Je-in and Jeon Chan-ho signed a contract with SBS's Studio S to write a 20-episode television series which could not be broadcast on another channel. Studio S provided the writers a workplace where they worked on the script for Sisyphus: The Myth, but the production was eventually cancelled due to the difficulties in casting directors and actors. In December 2018, the duo were put in charge of writing the remaining 36 episodes of Fates & Furies when the previous screenwriter left after writing 4 episodes. However, Studio S did not pay the ₩60 million writing fees which were to be paid within 15 days after the conclusion of the series. The duo terminated their contract with Studio S and turned to JTBC for the broadcast of Sisyphus: The Myth. Studio S filed a lawsuit which they lost in November 2020.

Casting
In late September 2019, JTBC confirmed that Cho Seung-woo and Park Shin-hye would star in Jin Hyuk's mystery drama Sisyphus: The Myth.

Filming
Principal photography began in May 2020, with Cho Seung-woo joining after completing his work on the second season of Stranger, and filming was completed in early December. Production was temporarily halted in late November 2020 due to the COVID-19 pandemic.

Original soundtrack

Part 1

Part 2

Part 3

Part 4

Part 5

Viewership

References

External links
  
 
 
 

JTBC television dramas
2021 South Korean television series debuts
2021 South Korean television series endings
South Korean mystery television series
South Korean fantasy television series
South Korean pre-produced television series
Television productions suspended due to the COVID-19 pandemic
Television series by JTBC Studios
Television series by Drama House
Korean-language Netflix exclusive international distribution programming